Neosparassus is a genus of huntsman spiders first described by Henry Roughton Hogg in 1903. Members of this genus most closely resemble those of Heteropoda, except that the cephalothorax is high, peaking between the midpoint and the eyes, before sloping toward the back. This angle causes the front of these spiders to appear more prominent than it actually is.

Species
 it contains the following species:

Neosparassus calligaster (Thorell, 1870) — Australia
Neosparassus conspicuus (L. Koch, 1875) — Queensland
Neosparassus diana (L. Koch, 1875) — Western Australia, Victoria, Tasmania
Neosparassus festivus (L. Koch, 1875) — New South Wales
Neosparassus grapsus (Walckenaer, 1837) — Australia
Neosparassus haemorrhoidalis (L. Koch, 1875) — New South Wales
Neosparassus incomtus (L. Koch, 1875) — New South Wales
Neosparassus inframaculatus (Hogg, 1896) — Central Australia
Neosparassus macilentus (L. Koch, 1875) — Queensland, Victoria
Neosparassus magareyi Hogg, 1903 — Australia
Neosparassus nitellinus (L. Koch, 1875) — Queensland
Neosparassus pallidus (L. Koch, 1875) — Queensland
Neosparassus patellatus (Karsch, 1878) — Tasmania
Neosparassus pictus (L. Koch, 1875) — Queensland
Neosparassus praeclarus (L. Koch, 1875) — Queensland
Neosparassus punctatus (L. Koch, 1865) — Australia
Neosparassus rutilus (L. Koch, 1875) — Queensland
Neosparassus salacius (L. Koch, 1875) — Queensland, New South Wales
Neosparassus thoracicus Hogg, 1903 — Northern Australia

References

Sparassidae
Araneomorphae genera
Spiders of Australia